Poecilanthrax willistoni, Williston's bee fly or sand dune bee fly, is a member of the Bombyliidae insect family. This family includes the bee flies, true flies that have developed Batesian mimicry characteristics to avoid predators. That is, they look like bees because that helps them avoid bee-wary predators, but they lack stingers.

P. willistoni also has larvae that act as parasitoids on other insect species. They drop their eggs strategically so that when the larvae emerge they can easily locate and consume grubs and caterpillars. The bee fly sometimes propels its eggs into holes where beetles live, and when the bee fly's eggs hatch, the larvae attack and eat the beetles' offspring. This species of bee fly lives on sand dunes, and so parasitizes sand dune insect species.

This species at a glance resembles a bee, fumbling flowers for nectar and sporting alternating orange and black bars down its abdomen. Unlike a bee, however, it has large red eyes and long, swept-back wings that it holds out from its body.

Distribution
In Canada, it is found in the provinces of Alberta, British Columbia, Manitoba and Saskatchewan; in the United States, it occurs in Arizona, California, Colorado, Idaho, Kansas, Nevada, New Mexico, North Dakota, Oklahoma, Oregon, South Dakota, Utah, Washington and Wyoming; in Mexico, it is only found in Baja California.

References 

Bombyliidae
Insects used as insect pest control agents
Diptera of North America
Insects described in 1887
Taxa named by Daniel William Coquillett